Nazeem Bartman (born 13 August 1993) is a South African soccer player who plays as a forward for Forward Madison in the USL League One.

Career 
Bartman played college soccer at Tyler Junior College, where he played for two years before transferring to the University of South Florida in 2015.

Bartman played with USL PDL side Michigan Bucks in 2013.

On 17 January 2017, Bartman was selected in the fourth round (73rd overall) of the 2017 MLS SuperDraft by Vancouver Whitecaps FC. He signed with Whitecaps FC 2 on 27 April 2017.

In July 2020, following stints with National Independent Soccer Association sides Atlanta SC and Stumptown Athletic, Bartman made an appearance with Louisiana Krewe FC during the NISA Independent Cup tournament. He scored a goal against Gaffa FC in the second leg of the Central Plains Region semifinals, and eventually converted a penalty kick shootout attempt, before the team fell 3–3 (8–9 pk).

In 2021, Bartman returned to play with Des Moines Menace.

On 16 March 2022, Bartman signed with USL League One club Forward Madison. On June 6, 2022, Bartman was named USL League One player of the week for Week 10 of the 2022 USL League One season after tallying a goal and an assist in Madison's 2-1 victory over FC Tucson.

References

External links 
 
 

1993 births
Living people
Sportspeople from Cape Town
Association football forwards
South African soccer players
South Florida Bulls men's soccer players
Flint City Bucks players
Whitecaps FC 2 players
Myrtle Beach Mutiny players
Stumptown AC players
Expatriate soccer players in Canada
USL League Two players
USL Championship players
National Independent Soccer Association players
Vancouver Whitecaps FC draft picks
Des Moines Menace players
Forward Madison FC players